Sadoluwa "Dolu" Opoola Lanlehin (born October 23, 1987)  is a Nigerian prince.

Family history
Lanlehin was born in the southern city of Lagos, Nigeria.  Lanlehin's grandfather, Chief S. O. Lanlehin, was a major chieftain in Ibadan and a founding leader of the Ibadan Peoples Party.  His uncle, Olufemi Lanlehin, is currently serving as the senator of Oyo State's South district in Nigeria's National Assembly.

Formal education
Sadoluwa Lanlehin attended Loyola Jesuit College, a prominent Jesuit boarding school in the federal capital, Abuja. He attended university abroad at the University of Notre Dame in the United States, where he studied Civil Engineering.  In 2015, Lanlehin received a Master of Business Administration from INSEAD.

Career
Lanlehin began his career working as a mechanical engineer. After receiving his MBA degree, Lanlehin was employed as a consultant at Bain & Company for several years. He is now in the finance industry leading market strategy at PayPal.

Latvian ambassadorship
During his undergraduate education at the University of Notre Dame, Lanlehin formed a close friendship with Christopher Doughty, nephew of Latvian Secretary of State Andris Teikmanis.  In recent years Lanlehin has worked toward fostering Latvian-Nigerian relations, and after visiting Latvia and meeting Teikmanis, helped organize a Latvian trade mission to Nigeria that resulted in a pledge toward greater trade partnership between the two countries.

References

1987 births
Living people
Yoruba people
People from Lagos
University of Notre Dame alumni
Nigerian royalty
Yoruba princes
Nigerian princes
Residents of Lagos